State Route 278 (SR 278) is a primary state highway in the U.S. state of Virginia. Known as King Street, the state highway runs  from U.S. Route 258 (US 258) north to an entrance to Langley Air Force Base within the independent city of Hampton.

Route description

SR 278 begins at a diamond interchange with US 258 (Mercury Boulevard). King Street continues south as an unnumbered street toward downtown Hampton. The state highway heads north as a five-lane road with a center left-turn lane through a residential area. SR 278 loses the center turn lane at Little Back River Road and becomes two lanes at Lamington Road. The state highway gains an additional lane northbound before reaching its northern terminus at a gate for Langley Air Force Base. North of the gate, the roadway crosses the Back River to reach the main body of the military installation.

Major intersections

References

External links

Virginia Highways Project: VA 278

State Route 278
278